John Paisley may refer to:
John Paisley (CIA officer) (1923–1978)
John Paisley (actor) (born 1938)